The hornpipe is any of several dance forms played and danced in Britain and Ireland and elsewhere from the 16th century until the present day. The earliest references to hornpipes are from England, with Hugh Aston's Hornepype of 1522 and others referring to Lancashire hornpipes in 1609 and 1613.

It is suggested that the hornpipe as a dance began around the 16th century on English sailing vessels. However, the dance does not seem to have become associated with sailors until after 1740 when the dancer Yates performed 'a hornpipe in the character of a Jack Tar' at Drury Lane Theatre, after which, in 1741 at Covent Garden we hear of "a hornpipe by a gentleman in the character of a sailor". Movements were those familiar to sailors of that time: "looking out to sea" with the right hand to the forehead, then the left, lurching as in heavy weather, and giving the occasional rhythmic tug to their breeches both fore and aft.

Folk hornpipes 
The hornpipe is an Irish, Scottish and English dance.  It is done in hard shoes, which are used to help keep track of how the dancer keeps in time.  There are two variations of the hornpipe dance: fast and slow.  Usually, more experienced dancers will do the slow hornpipe, but younger dancers will start out with the fast hornpipe and then switch in later years.  There is a change of tempo in the music, but not the dancing between these two speeds.  The only difference in the dancing between the fast and slow steps are the dances that the competitor does and the rhythm/sound of how they move their legs.  The rhythm for both fast and slow hornpipes is very even and should be executed that way by the dancer.

 The most common use of the term nowadays refers to a class of tunes in  time. The dance is done in hard shoes. Perhaps the best known example is the "Sailors' Hornpipe". Some 19th-century examples mix the dotted and even styles. These led the form to being called the 'Newcastle Style'  The form dates back to the mid-18th century or earlier, but became much more popular in the early 19th century. Many hornpipes were written in this period, often with well-known composers. In Ireland, examples include "The Groves Hornpipe" and "The Boys of Bluehill". In England, a noted composer of hornpipes on Tyneside was the influential fiddler-publican James Hill  (c.1811–1853). The form also became very popular in the United States – "President Garfield's Hornpipe" being an example.
 A lively  time dance rhythm, which remained popular in northern English and lowland Scottish instrumental music until the 19th century. Many examples are still well known and widely played in Northumberland, such as the song "Dance ti thy Daddy", and the variation set "Lads of Alnwick". Often these tunes have off-beat accents, usually in even-numbered bars, presumably corresponding to the (lost) dance steps. The form, having short strains, with a simple fixed harmonic scheme, and recognisable tags at the ends, is very suitable for the playing of variations.  This has probably accounted for its survival among players of the Northumbrian smallpipes. "Lads of Alnwick", in particular, has survived in the oral and manuscript tradition without major change from its earliest known appearance in the 1730s in William Dixon's MS, until the modern era, when an almost identical 5-strain version was written down by Tom Clough.
These may have been thought of as differing only inessentially from the   hornpipes. Some early examples of these are also syncopated. The form survives in Northumberland and Ireland. One example, "Mad Moll", or "The Peacock Follows the Hen", has remained current since at least 1698 when it appeared in The Dancing Master. Such tunes are usually referred to nowadays by the Irish name slip jig.

Examples, current in Northumberland,  of all these kinds of hornpipe may be found, either recorded or notated, on the FARNE archive website . The earliest musician's manuscript to contain hornpipes is the Henry Atkinson MS (a Facsimile of which may be found at FARNE). John Offord's John of the Green – The Cheshire Way, is an extensive study of published and manuscript dance music in these forms from before 1750. This draws heavily on Thomas Marsden's Original Lancashire Hornpipes, Old and New, published by Henry Playford in 1705, as well as other sources.

In 1798 the Reverend Warner Warner journeyed through Wales. In describing a Welsh ball, he wrote, "The ball was concluded by a contest of agility between two brothers, who danced two distinct hornpipes with so much power and muscle, variety of step and inflexible perseverance, as exceeded everything we had seen.

Baroque hornpipe 

The triple-time hornpipe dance rhythm was often used by composers in England in the Baroque period. It is probably artificial to draw too rigid a distinction between the popular and art-music examples. Many country dance examples are found in The Dancing Master, such as "The Hole in the Wall" (Hornpipe No.8 from the incidental music to Abdelazer by Henry Purcell), and there are also extant notated theatrical and ball choreographies that use steps from French court ballet, but which characteristically have some step-units going across the measure. Henry Purcell and George Frideric Handel composed hornpipes, and Handel occasionally gave "alla hornpipe" as a tempo indication (see Handel's Water Music). Today, the most well-known baroque hornpipe tune is probably the 'Alla Hornpipe' movement from the D major of Handel's Water Music suites. Hornpipes are occasionally found in German music of this period.

See also 
Egg dance
Reel (dance)
Jig
Polka
Mazurka
Slide (tune type)
Highland fling
Schottische
Strathspey (dance)
The Sailor's Hornpipe
Waltz

References

External links 
Videos on YouTube :

Old  hornpipes
Country Dance Hornpipe (a modern rendition of Purcell's Hornpipe "Hole in the Wall" (1698) in Playford's Dancing Master) (accessed 14 May 2009)
Barockmusik: "Alla Hornpipe" (excerpt from Handel's Water Music) (accessed 14 May 2009)

Newer  hornpipes:
Lancashire Clog Dance (accessed 11 March 2011)
Irish Step Dance: Hornpipe (accessed 11 March 2011)
Highland Dancing: Sailor's Hornpipe (accessed 11 March 2011)

Baroque dance
Baroque music
Dance forms in classical music
English music
European folk dances
Irish styles of music
Scottish country dance
Irish dances
Competitive dance